The sailfin weever, Trachinus collignoni, is a fish of the family Trachinidae, order Perciformes, and class Actinopterygii. Widespread in the Eastern Atlantic along the tropical coast of west Africa, Gabon and Congo, probably further north and south.

References

sailfin weever
Fish of the East Atlantic
Fish of West Africa
Marine fauna of West Africa
sailfin weever